Halileh (also Romanized as Halīleh, Haleyleh, and Heleyleh) is a village in Howmeh Rural District, in the Central District of Bushehr County, Bushehr Province, Iran. At the 2006 census, its population was 1,986, in 468 families.

References 

Populated places in Bushehr County